The 1958 All-Atlantic Coast Conference football team consists of American football players chosen by various selectors for their All-Atlantic Coast Conference ("ACC") teams for the 1958 NCAA University Division football season. Selectors in 1958 included the Associated Press (AP) and the United Press International (UPI).  Players selected to the first team by both the AP and UPI are displayed below in bold.

All-Atlantic Coast selections

Ends
 Al Goldstein, North Carolina (AP-1; UPI-1)
 Ray Masneri, Clemson (AP-1)
 Ben Scotti, Maryland (UPI-1)

Tackles
 Phil Blazer, North Carolina (AP-1; UPI-1)
 Ed Pitts, South Carolina (AP-1)
 Jim Padgett, Clemson (UPI-1)

Guards
 Mike McGee, Duke (AP-1; UPI-1) (College Football Hall of Fame)
 Rod Breedlove, Maryland (AP-1)
 Bill Rearick, North Carolina State (UPI-1)

Centers
 Bill Thomas, Clemson (AP-1)
 Ronnie Koes, North Carolina (UPI-1)

Backs
 Jack Cummings, North Carolina (AP-1 [QB]; UPI-1)
 Wray Carlton, Duke (AP-1; UPI-1)
 Alex Hawkins, South Carolina (AP-1; UPI-1)
 Wade Smith, North Carolina (AP-1 [HB])
 John Saunders, South Carolina (UPI-1)

Key
AP = Associated Press

UPI = United Press International

See also
1958 College Football All-America Team

References

All-Atlantic Coast Conference football team
All-Atlantic Coast Conference football teams